Rachel Goldstein may refer to:
 A fictional character in the television show Water Rats.
 A fictional character in the television show Seinfeld.  See